Kostelec nad Labem is a town in the Central Bohemian Region of the Czech Republic. It has about 4,200 inhabitants. The historic town centre is well preserved and is protected by law as an urban monument zone.

Administrative parts

The village of Jiřice is an administrative part of Kostelec nad Labem.

Geography
It lies in a flat landscape in the Central Elbe Table. The town is situated on the left bank of the Elbe River.

History

Kostelec was probably founded by Ottokar II of Bohemia in the second half of the 13th century. The first known owners of Kostelec were the Borš family from Osek, which the settlement was took over by Ottokar II in 1270.

The market town later belonging to Queen Elizabeth of Bohemia became the dowry town of Czech queens. The queen granted privileges to the town and the mill, relieved the town of some duties. There were many ponds around Kostelec. To the northwest stood a water fortress, which well fortified served as a castle.
Charles IV pawned Kostelec to his wife Elizabeth of Pomerania. She gave the town other privileges, which Charles IV confirmed. Around 1364, the town was hit by a great fire, destroying many houses, after which it lost its town privileges.

In the 15th century, Kostelec was owned by the Berka of Dubá family, from whom the Queen Joanna of Rožmitál, the widow of King George of Poděbrady, purchased it. Under the rule of King Vladislaus II, in 1486, Kostelec was promoted to a town.

The Jewish community was established in Kostelec around 1505. It came to an end in 1940. Jews were mostly buyers, they bought houses in the town, the municipal council also reserved a cemetery for them. They introduced a school for children around 1717. In 1886, the granary was rebuilt into a synagogue, which was demolished after 1948.

Demographics

Sights

The originally a Gothic town hall was rebuilt in the Renaissance style after a fire in 1551, and heavily modified in 1727 and 1820. it is a foot corner building with a prismatic tower, divided by rectangular windows with a pillar in the corner.

Church of Saint Vitus is a late Gothic building with a presbytery built before 1492, and three-nave from the beginning of the 16th century. In 1566–1567, the church was rebuilt in the Renaissance style, then it was modified in the 17th century and in 1728. The south vestibule is from the middle of the 18th century, and the bell tower was modified in 1829.

The Church of Saint Martin is a cemetery church, originally a parish church built in 1361 at the latest. It was rebuilt in the late Gothic style, and its chapel was renovated in the 17th century. In 1769, it was extended by the western tower and a choir was built.

The old Jewish cemetery was founded in 1594 and is one of the oldest in Bohemia. Only newer tombstones from the second half of the 19th century are preserved. It has around 300 tombstones.

The fortress in Kostelec nad Labem was first mentioned in 1359. In 1864, it was turned into a private residence, and it is still used for this purpose today.

Notable people
Teresa Stolz (1834–1902), operatic soprano

References

External links

Cities and towns in the Czech Republic
Populated places in Mělník District
Populated riverside places in the Czech Republic
Populated places on the Elbe